Superficial reflexes may refer to the:

 Abdominal reflex
 Cremasteric reflex
 Cutaneous reflex